The Dorset Village Historic District encompasses a significant portion of the village center of Dorset, Vermont.  Centered at the junction of Church Street, Kent Hill Road, and Vermont Route 30, the village was developed between the late 18th and early 20th centuries, and has a number of well-preserved unusual features, including sidewalks of marble from local quarries.  The district was listed on the National Register of Historic Places in 1985, and was enlarged to the west in 1997.

Description and history
Dorset is a town in northern Bennington County, in the Taconic Range of western Vermont.  Its village center is in the western portion of the town, whose major north–south route, Vermont Route 30, traverses the valley of the Mettawee River.  At its junction with Church Street and Kent Hill Road, Route 30 is on the east side of the river, with Church Street extending west, across the river, to West Road.  These two roads form the heart of the district, which extends north and south from their junction.  A cluster of wood frame commercial buildings are to be found there, along with a number of mainly 19th-century wood-frame houses.  Notable public buildings include the marble-faced Gothic Revival Congregational Church, and the c. 1800 Sykes Memorial Building of the Dorset Village Library.  Some of the sidewalks along Church Street are faced in marble, quarried locally at some Vermont's oldest marble quarries.  Extending westward along Church Street the village becomes more dispersed and residential, although there was once a gristmill adjacent to Prentiss Pond.  The district also includes the Dorset Golf Links, one of the oldest golf courses in the nation (founded 1886).

This was followed later in the year by the establishment of the Vermont Republic, which operated independently until becoming the fourteenth state in 1791. Dorset grew first as a mainly agricultural area, but received a significant boost when marble from its quarries became prized for a variety of projects nationwide. The lack of significant water power, and later of good rail connections, limited the village center's growth in the 19th century, and it was eclipsed in importance by East Dorset.

When the historic district was first listed on the National Register in 1985, it only extended as far west as Prentiss Pond, roughly midway along Church Street.  It was enlarged in 1997 to include the residential areas west of the pond to West Road, extending north and south along that road for a way.

See also
National Register of Historic Places listings in Bennington County, Vermont

References

Historic districts on the National Register of Historic Places in Vermont
Federal architecture in Vermont
Greek Revival architecture in Vermont
Victorian architecture in Vermont
Dorset, Vermont
National Register of Historic Places in Bennington County, Vermont
Historic districts in Bennington County, Vermont